All the players had to be born after 1 January 1996.

Players name marked in bold have been capped at full international level.

Argentina
Manager: Humberto Grondona

Bolivia
Manager: Freddy Bolívar

Brazil
Manager: Alexandre Gallo

Chile
Manager: Mariano Puyol

Colombia
Manager: Harold Rivera

Ecuador
Manager: José Javier Rodríguez Mayorga

Paraguay
Manager: Hugo Caballero

Peru
Manager: Edgar Teixeira

Uruguay
Manager: Fabián Coito

Venezuela
Manager: Rafael Dudamel

External links
Official list of players

South American Under-17 Football Championship squads